The Aetos class were four destroyers were originally constructed for the Argentine Navy as the San Luis class. In Greek they are known as the Thiria ("Wild Beasts") class, after the ships' names. They were purchased by the Royal Hellenic Navy in October 1912 when the Greek government expanded its navy after losing the Greco-Turkish War of 1897 and in anticipation of the Balkan Wars. In December 1916, during World War I, three of the destroyers were seized by France and served in the French Navy until 1918, all except Panthir. They were returned to Greece in 1918. In 1924–1925, they were extensively rebuilt and continued in service into World War II, where they fought with the Allies. Leon was sunk by German aircraft at Suda Bay, Crete. The other three destroyers survived the war and were used as station ships during the Greek Civil War. They were discarded in 1946.

Design 

The Aetos class was powered by two Parsons geared turbines turning two shafts and fed steam by five coal-fired White-Forster boilers. They carried  of coal. The destroyers were initially armed with four single-mounted  guns and four single-mounted  torpedo tubes. They had an initial complement of 90.

Modifications
Significant changes were made between 1924 and 1935, when the ships were reconstructed by J. Samuel White. Four Yarrow oil-fired boilers replaced the coal-fired ones, allowing the number of funnels to be reduced from five to two. One 4-inch gun was moved to a new shelter deck forward of the bridge, allowing four single torpedo tube mountings to be replaced by two triple mountings which were turnable; two 2-pounder anti-aircraft (AA) guns were also added. Two ships were further modified in to carry 40 naval mines.

The three surviving members of the class, Ierax, Panthir and Aetos underwent further modifications. Their 4-inch guns were reduced to three, with the 'X' and 'Y' mounts landed for increased depth charge storage. The aft-most gun was replaced by four depth charge throwers. Furthermore, three  cannon were added for AA defence and Type 123A asdic was installed. Two single  AA guns replaced the 2-pounder guns.

Ships in class

History 

The four ships in this class had originally been ordered by Argentina in 1909 from the English shipyard Cammell Laird in Birkenhead as the San Luis class. The four ships were launched in 1911 as San Luis, Santa Fe, Santiago del Estero and Tucumán. They were purchased by Greece for 148,000 pounds each in October 1912, as the outbreak of the First Balkan War was imminent, and renamed Aetos, Ierax, Panthir and Leon respectively.

The ships hoisted the Greek flag and sailed independently from Britain, still manned with Argentine crews, for Algiers. Aetos suffered a breakdown during the voyage and had to be towed to Algiers. There the ships were taken over by Greek crews, carried on the steamer Ionia. Although the ships were completely unknown to the Greeks before then, and all manuals and labels on the ship were in Spanish, within 24 hours all had been made ready to sail and began their voyage to Greece. Within a few days of arriving at the Salamis Naval Base, they were sent to join the main Greek battlefleet at Lemnos, apart from Aetos, which underwent five weeks of repairs. Due to the haste with which the purchase had been made, only limited ammunition for operations was purchased: some 3,000 shells for the ships' guns, and no torpedoes. As a result, during the First Balkan War, the ships served and were designated as "scout ships" (ανιχνευτικά) rather than destroyers (αντιτορπιλικά).

In December 1916, the French Navy landed troops near Athens to put pressure on the royal government of King Constantine I of Greece during the Greek "National Schism". After French troops were ambushed by Greeks, French naval ships fired upon the city. In retaliation for the series of events, France seized several Greek vessels, including three destroyers of the Aetos class. Aetos, Ierax and Leon were seized by France in December 1916 and placed in service with the French Navy. In French service, the ships had a complement of 102. They served with the French Navy in 1917–1918, primarily in an anti-submarine capacity. Following some objections by senior French naval officers, the Aetos class were officially returned to the Greek Navy in 1917. However, due to a shortage of trained Greek personnel and that they were refitting in French naval yards, there was a delay in the actual handover. In 1918, the four destroyers, alongside the cruiser , joined the British Royal Navy's Aegean Squadron at Mudros.

Following the end of World War I, the four destroyers were extensively refitted in 1924–1925, undergoing further modifications in 1931. In World War II, after the Axis invasion of Greece, the four ships served with the Allies. Leon was damaged by German aircraft on 22 May 1941 and sunk at Suda Bay, Crete on 15 May 1941. The remaining three were refitted in Madras, Calcutta and Port Sudan during 1941 and 1942. Ierax, Panthir and Aetos remained in service until 1945, serving under British Royal Navy control. In 1944–1945 they were made station ships. The three destroyers were discarded in 1946 following the war.

Notes

Citations

Sources

External links

Naval History
  Exploradores de 1912 - Astillero Laird Brothers (accessed 2017-02-04)

Destroyer classes